"Thug Love" is a song recorded by American rapper 50 Cent for his debut studio album Power of the Dollar (2000). The song was written by 50 Cent, Rashad Smith, Joshua Michael Schwartz, Brian Kierulf and Nycolia "Tye-V" Turman and was produced by Smith with co-production from Schwartz and Kierulf. The song features guest vocals from American girl group Destiny's Child. A music video was to be filmed to accompany the song, but was cancelled when 50 Cent was shot nine times just three days before the video was scheduled to be filmed.

References 

1999 singles
50 Cent songs
Destiny's Child songs
Songs written by 50 Cent
Song recordings produced by Brian Kierulf
Songs written by Brian Kierulf
Songs written by Josh Schwartz
Song recordings produced by Josh Schwartz
Gangsta rap songs
1999 songs
Songs written by Rashad Smith